Betsy Woodruff Swan ( Woodruff; born October 31, 1989) is an American journalist who is currently a national political reporter for Politico and contributor to MSNBC.

Biography 
Swan was born in  Columbia, Missouri. She graduated with a BA in English from Hillsdale College in 2012.

Swan started her career as a reporter and William F. Buckley Fellow at National Review. Amid a wider staff exodus from National Review in 2014, Swan moved after two years to the Washington Examiner to become a political writer covering Capitol Hill and electoral politics. Swan joined the news magazine Slate as a national political reporter in late 2014. She then became a national political reporter for The Daily Beast in March 2015, covering federal law enforcement. Swan has appeared on Fox News and CNN and is a contributor to MSNBC. On March 4, 2020, Swan announced she would be leaving The Daily Beast and had been hired at Politico.

Swan married Axios reporter Jonathan Swan on September 14, 2019. They have one child.

References

External links 
 Betsy Woodruff Swan on Twitter
 

1989 births
Living people
American reporters and correspondents
American women journalists
Slate (magazine) people
Hillsdale College alumni
MSNBC people

People from Purcellville, Virginia